Palamedes may refer to:

 Palamedes (Arthurian legend), a Saracen Knight of the Round Table in the Arthurian legend
 Palamedes (romance), a 13th-century French Arthurian romance named after the knight
 Palamedes (mythology), the son of Nauplius in Greek mythology
 Palamedes (video game), a 1990 video game
 2456 Palamedes, an asteroid

People
 Anthonie Palamedesz. (1601–1673), Dutch genre and portrait painter and brother of Palamedes Palamedesz. (I)
 Palamedes Palamedesz. (I) (1605–1638), Dutch battle scene painter and brother of Anthonie Palamedesz.

See also
 
 Palamede, the Italian form
 Palamède (disambiguation), the French form